This is a list of defunct or abandoned airports in the United States.

Note: A more complete list of abandoned airfields in the US can be found at the website that is cited in many of the entries below.

Alabama
There are at least 68 in the state.

Anniston Army Airfield
Barin Naval Auxiliary Air Station  
Brundidge Municipal Airport
Coosa County Airport (69A)
Eutaw Municipal Airport
Faircloth Naval Outlying Landing Field
Freddie Jones Field
Fort McClellan Army Airfield
Fort Morgan Airfield
Magnolia Naval Outer Landing Field
Mallard Airport
Moundville Airport
Perry County Airport
Selfield Aux AAF#1 
Skywest Airpark
Silverhill Naval Outer Landing Field
Skyharbor Airport
South Huntsville Airport
Summerdale Naval Outer Landing Field (NFD)
Tuskegee Army Airfield
Uniontown Airport
Wheelless Airport
Wolf Naval Outer Landing Field

Alaska

Arness Lake Airport 
Cape Sabine Airport
Chignik Fisheries Airport
Gunsight Mountain Airport 
Fort Glenn Army Airstrip
Haycock Airport
Loring Seaplane Base
Lost River 1 Airport
Jonesville Mine Airport 
Lake Louise Airport
Miller Army Airfield 
Myrtle Creek Airport
Pauloff Harbor Seaplane Base 
Porcupine Creek Airport 
Oliktok LRRS Airport
PAF Cannery Airport (Pacific American Fisheries)
Sagwon Airport
Skelton Airport
Tahneta Pass Airport 
Tok Airport
Weeks Field

Arizona

Air Haven Airport
Bowie Airport
Ganado Airport
Forepaugh Airport
Lake Havasu City Airport (the original location)
Red Butte Aerodrome/Grand Canyon Airport
Sahuarita AF Flight Strip
Transwestern Pipeline Company Airfield
Three Point Airport
Tuweep Airport
Turf Paradise Airfield

Arkansas
Dennis F. Cantrell Field
Lost Bridge Village Airport
Saline County Airport (Watts Field) in Benton
Silver Wings Field in Eureka Springs

California

Alum Rock Airport
Amboy Airfield
Apple Valley Airport
Brown-Fabian Airport
Cal Poly, San Luis Obispo
Capital Sky Park, West Sacramento
Capistrano Airport, San Juan Capistrano
Carmel Valley Airport
Colton Airport, Colton
Crissy Field
Crawford Airport
Culver City Airport, Culver City
Deer Creek Ranch Airport
Del Mar Municipal Airport
Disneyland Helipad
Fontana
Dycer Airport, Gardena
Gardena Valley Airport, Gardena
Gardner Army Airfield
Giant Rock, Yucca Valley
Grand Central Airport
Green Acres, Visalia
Griffith Park Aerodrome
Gelderman Airport
Luebkeman Airport
Hamilton Air Force Base
Hamilton Cove Seaplane Base
Hamilton Army Airfield
Mare Island Naval Shipyard Airfield
Helendale Airport
Hilton Field, Boulder Creek
Hughes Airport
Marine Corps Air Station El Toro
Marine Corps Air Station Tustin
Meadowlark Airport
Milpitas Airport
 Mission Airport, San Gabriel  
Monrovia Airport, California
 Montebello Airport
Vail Airport, Montebello
Natomas Field, Sacramento
Naval Air Station Alameda
North Shore Beach Estates, Salton Sea
Quartz Hill Airport
Rancho California Airport, Temecula
Conejo Valley Airport, Thousand Oaks
Rialto Municipal Airport
Rice Army Airfield
Rosemead Airport, Rosemead
Santa Susana Airport
San Fernando Airport
Skyways Airport
Sierra Airdrome, also called Hastings Airport
Sacramento Sky Ranch
Santa Cruz Sky Park
Sky Ranch, Puente
Spring Valley Airport
Soggy Dry Lake, Lucerne Valley
Tri-City Airport, Loma Linda
Thompson, Murrieta
Valley View, Ridgecrest
War Eagle Field
Willow Creek

Colorado
Avon STOLPort
Fort Collins Downtown Airport
Nichols Field (Colorado Springs)
Stapleton International Airport (Denver)
 Skyline Airport Watkins, Colorado

Connecticut
Ansonia
Griswold Airport/Hammonasset Airport (N04) in Madison
Johnnycake/Mountain Meadow Airstrip in Burlington
Lakeside Airport 
New Canaan
New London–Waterford Airport in Waterford
Rentschler Field
Stamford

Delaware
Rehoboth Beach

District of Columbia
Naval Air Station Anacostia
Bolling Air Force Base

Florida
Epcot Center Ultralight Flightpark
Imeson Field
Naval Air Station Richmond
Opa-locka West Airport 
Taylor Field
Tallahassee Commercial Airport
Tampa Bay Executive Airport

Georgia
Liberty County Airport
Morris Army Airfield
 Naval Air Station Glynco
Naval Air Station Atlanta
South Fulton Skyport (8A9) Palmetto
Turner Air Force Base
Stone Mountain Airport

Hawaii

Haleiwa Fighter Strip
Kaanapali Airport
Kipapa Airfield
Kona Airport
Kualoa Airfield
Marine Corps Air Station Ewa
Morse Field
MCAS Ewa
Naval Auxiliary Landing Field Ford Island
Puunene Naval Air Station
Stanley Army Airfield

Idaho
Strawberry Glenn Airport in Boise

Illinois

Arlington NOLF / Arlington Airport
Ashburn Flying Field
Carthage Airport
Chicagoland Airport
Crestwood/Howell Airport 
Earlville Airport
Half Day Naval Outlying Landing Field
Hillsboro Municipal Airport
Howell-New Lenox Airport
Machesney Airport
Meigs Field
Naval Air Station Glenview      
Ravenswood Airport
Springfield (Commercial) Southwest Municipal Airport 
Sky Harbor Airport 
Wagon Wheel Airport

Indiana

Action Airpark
Aretz Airport
Butler
Decatur Hi-Way Airport
Dresser Field
Elwood Airport
Emison Auxiliary Army Airfield
Harrold Airport 
Michigan City Municipal 
O'Neal Airport 
Speedway Airport 
Stout Army Air Field 
Walesboro Auxiliary Army Airfield

Iowa
Hawarden Municipal Airport
Eldora Municipal Airport
Lambert Fechter Municipal Airport 
NOLF Linby
Wall Lake Municipal Airport

Kansas
Hamilton Field
Wilroads Gardens Airport
Paul Windle Municipal Airport
Fairfax Airport
Plainville Airpark 
Stockton Municipal Airport
Maize Airport

Kentucky
 Dale Hollow Regional Airport (Petro Field)
Hardin County Airport (Ben Floyd Field) 
Standard Field
Morehead-Rowan County Airport
Breckenridge Army Airfield
Olive Hill Airport 
Whitesburg Municipal Airport

Louisiana
Colfax Airport 
Downtown Airport
Haynesville Airport 
Charlie Hammonds Seaplane Base
East Lake Charles Airport
Ruston Municipal Airport

Maine
St. Croix Airport
Naval Air Station Brunswick

Maryland
 Baltimore Airpark
 Baltimore Municipal Airport
 Congressional Airport
 Schromm Field

Massachusetts
Agawam-Springfield Harbor Seaplane Base in Agawam
Bowles Agawam Airport in Agawam
Braintree Airport
Chatham Seaplane Base in Chatham
Fall River Municipal Airport
Haverhill Riverside Seaplane Base in Haverhill
Merrimac Valley Seaplane Base in Methuen
Monponsett Pond Seaplane Base in Halifax
Naval Air Station South Weymouth
Naval Air Station Squantum
Springfield Airport
Tew-Mac Airport

Michigan

Acme Skyport  
Allen Airport
Allens Airport
 Alma Airport / Sharrard's Field 
Anchor Bay Field, a/k/a Fair Haven Field
Au Gres Airport 
Austin Lake Airport & Seaplane Base
Aviation Country Club
Baker Airport 
Bean Blossom Airport
Beaverton
Berz-Macomb
Big Beaver Airport
Bonnie Field
Brooklyn Airfield
Burns Airport
Burns Landing Field
Calumet-Laurium Airport / Houghton County Airport 
Carriage Lane Airport
Coleman A. Young International Airport a/k/a Detroit City Airport
Corunna Airport
Craft's Field
Crystal Falls Airport
David Airfield / David's Airport 
Davis Airport
Detroit Army Artillery Armory Airfield, Oak Park
Double JJ Resort Ranch Airport
Douglas Lakeside Airport
Dr. A.L. Haight Airport 
Dudley Airport Standish
Erie Aerodrome
Erin Airport
Farmington Hills Airfield
Flat Rock Airport / Maveal Airport / Maveal Brothers Airport 
Ford Airport
Fraser Airport
Grand Rapids Municipal Airport / See Kent County Airport
Grand River Airpark & Seaplane Base
Gratiot Airport, a/k/a Packard Field, Greater Detroit Airport or Roseville Field. 
Haggerty Field / Detroit Aviation Testing Field 
Hance Airport 
Hartung Field
Hillsdale Airport
Holly Airport 
Houghton County Airport
Ishpeming Airport / Ishpeming-Dexter Airport  
John R. Airport
Jonesville Airport / Merchant Field
Krist Port 
Leathers Field / Naval Outer Landing Field 24922 Grosse Ile
Loar's Field, Onsted, Michigan
Marks' Field
Marquette County Airport 
Marysville Field
Mason Landing Field / Kelleys Airport 
Mayes Airport
McEnnan Airport 
McKinley Airport
Menominee County Airport 
Miller Airport /Nartron Field
Morgan Field
Motor Boat Seaplane Base / Garland's Seaplane Base 
Muzzy's Airport / L'Anse Landing Field 
Nan Bar Airport / NOLF 27106 / Flat Rock Field 
National Airways Airport / National Air Service Airport / National Airport
Oakland-Orion Airport
Oselka Airport
Packard Field, renamed Gratiot Airport in 1940, Roseville, Michigan a/k/a Greater Detroit Airport or Roseville Field.
Haggerty Field / Detroit Aviation Testing Field 
Packard Proving Ground Airfield
Plane Haven Airport
Poschke's Harbor Beach Airport 
Raco Army Landing Airfield
Ransom Field/Traverse City Ransom Field 
Rexton Airport / D A R Airport 
Riverland Airfield 
Robbins Airport (Madision Heights)
Saugatuck-Douglas Airport
Salem Airport
Scheidler Field 
Sheep Ranch NOLF 
Silver Ace Airport / Monroe Airport / Marshall Airport 
Smith Airport / Hartsell Air Terminal / National Airport
South Kent Airport
Spencer Landing Field / Spencer Airport / Vernon M Spencer Memorial Airfield / Wixom International Airport 
Standish City Airport / Standish Industrial Airport a/k/a Dudley Airport.
Stinson Factory Airfield  
Sunglen Airfield 
Tackaberry Airport Michigan Airport Directory
Thomas B. Joy Airport
Triangle Airport
Triangle Glider Port
Trott Brothers Airport / Almont Municipal Airport 
Utica Airport
Vanderbilt Airport (1st location) 
Vanderbilt Airfield (2nd location)
Vanderbilt Airport
Warren Airport, a/k/a Kinally Airport
Washtenaw Airport/ Young Airport
Wings Airport, Mound Road & 18 Mile Road in what is now Sterling Heights, Michigan.
Ypsilanti Airport / Gridley Airport
Yuba Airport

Minnesota
There are at least twenty in the state.
Devil's Track Municipal Airport
Grand Rapids–Itasca County Airport, Gordy Newstrom Field
New York Mills Municipal Airport
Pine City Municipal Airport

Mississippi
Fulton-Itawamba County Airport 
Jackson County Airport
Stinson Field Municipal Airport (Aberdeen)

Missouri

Bonne Terre Memorial Airport 
Myers Park Memorial Municipal Airport
Columbia Municipal Airport
E.W. Cotton Woods Memorial Airport
Richards-Gebaur Airport 
Independence Memorial Airport
Lake Winnebago Municipal Airport
Air Park South 
Princeton-Kauffman Memorial Airport 
St. Charles Airport
Arrowhead Airport
Weiss Airport

Montana

Belle Creek Airport
Broadus Airport 
Glasgow Air Force Base
Glendive Airport
Mountain Lakes Field 
Morgan Airport
Poplar Airport
Veseth Airport
Whitehall Intermediate Field

Nebraska

Arthur Municipal Airport 
Bruning Army Airfield
Harrison Skyranch
McCook Army Airfield
Grundman Field 
South Omaha Airport
Springview Municipal Airport
Wilber Municipal Airport

Nevada

Anderson Field
Barton Field 
Boulder City Airport
Buffalo Valley Intermediate Field
Chicken Ranch Airfield
Caliente Flight Strip 
Delamar Landing Field
Goldfield Airport
Hidden Hills Airport
Jackass Aeropark (Lathrop Wells Airport)
Pioche Municipal Airport
Sky Corral Airport
Sutcliffe Naval Outlying Landing Field
Tonopah Test Range (Mellan Airstrip)
Voc-Tech Airfield

New Jersey

Aero Haven Airport/Camden County Airport 
Asbury Park Neptune Airport 
Atlantic City Municipal Airport
Camden Central Airport
Crescent Airport
Li Calzi Airport
Marlboro Airport
Twin Pine Airport
Forrestal Airport
Rudy's Airport 
Piney Hollow Airfield

New Mexico
Alamo Navajo Airport
Oxnard Field
Coronado Airport
West Mesa Airport
Eunice Airport

New York 

Angola Airport
Ellenville Airport
Floyd Bennett Field (a small portion is still used as a police heliport)
Flushing Airport in Queens
Holmes Airport, aka Grand Central Air Terminal, Grand Central Airport in Queens
McPherson Seaplane Base in Ithaca
Miller Field in Staten Island
Mitchel Field
Monticello Airport
Oneida County Airport
Peekskill Seaplane Base
Roosevelt Field, aka Hempstead Plains Aerodrome, Hempstead Plains Field, Garden City Aerodrome, Hazelhurst Field in Mineola

North Carolina
Johnson Field
Brockenbrough Airport
Halifax County Airport
Raleigh Municipal Airport
Wilgrove Airpark

North Dakota
Pruetz Municipal Airport
Wimbledon Airport

Ohio

Chagrin Falls Airport 
Champion Executive Airport
Chardon Airfield
Cincinnati-Blue Ash Airport 
Freedom Air Field 
Griffing Sandusky Airport
Martin Airport 
Mid-City Airport
South Columbus Airport
Southern Airways Airport/Boardman Air Park
Strongsville Airpark 
Youngstown Executive Airport

Oklahoma
Teramiranda Airport
Idabel Airport
Love County Airport
Ashley Airport
Sky Park Airport
Oklahoma City Downtown Airpark

Oregon

Naval Air Station Tongue Point
Bernard's Airport
Willamette Airpark (T-Bird Airport)
Jantzen Beach Seaplane Base 
Swan Island Airport (Portland Municipal)
Springfield Airport 
Sutherlin Airport
Umatilla Army Airfield

Pennsylvania

Aliquippa Airport
Birchwood–Pocono Airport 
Cherry Springs Airport
Echo Airport
Erie County Airport
Glade Mill Airport
Hershey Airpark 
Huntingdon County Airport
Indian Lake Airport
Kutztown Airport 
McGinness Airport
McVille Airport
Miller Airport 
Mustin Field
Olmsted Air Force Base
Seven Springs Airport
State College Air Depot

Rhode Island
Charlestown NAAS (Atlantic Airport)
Newport Naval Air Facility
Naval Air Station Quonset Point

South Carolina
Chinquapin Airport
Coulbourne Airport
Lane Airport
Naval Air Station Charleston
Page Field
State Line Ultraport/Flightpark

South Dakota
Dupree Municipal Airport
Harrold Municipal Airport 
Skie Air Service Landing Field
McIntosh Municipal Airport
Mission Sioux Airport

Tennessee
Arlington Municipal Airport
Cornelia Fort Airpark
Franklin Wilkins Airport
Powell STOLport
Putnam County Airport
Scott Field (Decatur County Airport)

Texas

Abilene Municipal Airport (original)
Amarillo Municipal Airport (original)
An Khe Army Stage Field / Walker Red Fox Airfield (Authon)
Andrau Airpark (Alief)
Arlington Municipal Airport / Midway Airport / Greater Fort Worth International Airport / Amon Carter Field / Greater Southwest International Airport
Bay City Municipal Airport (original)
Bell Helicopter Auxiliary Heliport (Hurst)
Butterfield Trail Airport (North Abiline)
Cameron Airport (Angleton)
Camp Wolters / Fort Wolters Army Heliport (Mineral Wells)
Clear Lake Metro Port (Clear Lake City)
Clear Lake Ranch Airfield (Mankins)
Columbus Municipal Airport (original)
Cuero Field / Brayton Flying Field
D-Bar Ranch Airfield (Sanco)
Dalhart Aux AAF #1 / West Field
Dalhart Aux AAF #2 / Miller Field
Dalworth Airport / Curtiss-Wright Airport /Grand Prairie Municipal Airport / Grand Prairie NOLF /Grand Prairie Army Airfield
Davis Auxiliary Army Airfield #3 (League City)
Dempsey Army Heliport (Palo Pinto)
Denton Field / College Field
Downing Army Heliport (Mineral Wells)
Eagle Pass Army Airfield
Eagle Pass Auxiliary Army Airfield #1 / Cueves Field (Spofford)
Eagle Pass Auxiliary Army Airfield #3 / Barnard Ranch Airfield / Chittim Ranch Airfield (Eagle Pass)
Eagle Pass Municipal Airport
El Paso Municipal Airport (original)
Five-Points Field / Naval Outlying Landing Field 22913 (Watsonville)
Fort Wolters Army Stage Field #1 / Pinto Stagefield (Garner)
Fort Wolters Army Stage Field #2 / Sundance Stage Field (Salesville)
Fort Wolters Army Stage Field #3 / Ramrod Stage Field (Garner)
Fort Wolters Army Stage Field #4 / Mustang Stage Field (Salesville)
Fort Wolters Stage Field #6 / Bronco Stage Field (Garner)
Genoa Airport
Goodfellow AAF / Goodfellow AFB (San Angelo)
Guenther Municipal Airport / Guenther La Grange Airport 
Hartlee Field (Denton)
Hensley Field / Dallas Naval Air Station
Hitchcock Naval Air Station
Horizon Airport (West Texas Airport) 
Hue Stage Field (Garner)
Hueco Airport (El Paso)
Howard County Municipal Airport (Big Spring)
Jap Lee Airport (Irving)
KFDA-TV Airfield (Amarillo)
Lamesa Field (Arvana)
Laredo Air Force Auxiliary Airfield #2 (Aguilares)
Laredo Municipal Airport (Del Mar)
Link Ranch Airfield (Laredo)
Lite-Flite Ultraport (Katy)
Lou Foote Airport / Highway 77 Airport (Dallas)
Lubbock Army Airfield / Reese AFB
MacGuire Ranch Airfield (El Paso)
Maker Field / Hughes Airport (Abiline)
Mansfield Naval Outlying Landing Field / OLF 22614 
Pampa Army Airfield
Pearland Municipal Airport
Qui Nhon Army Stage Field (Salesville)
Red Bluff Auxiliary Army Airfield #1 (Seabrook)
Reeves Auxiliary Army Airfield #1 / Pampa Air Force Auxiliary Airfield #2
Rhodes Airport / Shallowater Airport
Robert Mueller Municipal Airport (Austin)
S & S Patrol Field (League City)
Skyport Airport (El Paso)
Spaceland Airport / Houston Gulf Airport (League City)
Sugar Land State Prison Airfield
Tarrant Naval Outlying Landing Field / Arlington Naval Outlying Landing Field / OLF 25811 (Arlington)
Terry County Air Force Auxiliary Airfield / Reese Air Force Auxiliary Airfield (Sundown) 
Tim's Airpark / Austin Executive Airpark
U & S Flying Service Airfield / Hamilton Field (Big Spring)
Val Verde County Airport (Del Rio)
Vancourt Army Airfield Aux #6 (Wall)
Victory Field (Vernon)
Vung Tau Army Stage Field
Weiser Airpark (Cypress) KEYQ
Winn Exploration Company Airport (Eagle Pass)

Utah
Jake Garn Airport
Tooele Municipal Airport
Tremonton Municipal Airport

Vermont
Fair Haven Municipal Airport
Robin's Nest Airport (North Windham Airport)
Miller Airport

Virginia

Beacon Field Airport
Falls Church Airpark
Hartwood Airport
Hoover Field
Parnell Airport (Richmond)
Pungo NOLF
Tappahannock Municipal Airport
University of Virginia Airport / Milton Field (Charlottesville)
Virginia State Police Airport (Richmond)
Washington Airport
Washington-Hoover Airport
Washington-Virginia Airport

Washington
Bellevue Airfield 
Blaine Municipal Airport
Evergreen Field
J-Z Airport 
Martha Lake Airport
Sky Harbor Airport
Vista Field

West Virginia
Roy Airfield
Weirton Airport

Wisconsin
Rice Lake Municipal Airport
 Aero Park Airport

Wyoming
Wardwell Field
Douglas Municipal Airport

Insular areas

American Samoa
Leone Airfield

Guam
Guam Northwest Army Airfield
Orote Field 
Northwest Field

Johnston Atoll
Johnston Atoll Airport

Midway Atoll
Henderson Field

Palmyra Atoll
Palmyra Atoll Airfield
Palmyra Runway

Northern Mariana Islands
North Field

Puerto Rico
Camp Garcia Vieques
Dorado Airport 
Losey Army Airfield
Salinas Auxiliary Aerodrome
Santa Isabel Auxiliary Airdrome
Ramey Air Force Base 
Roosevelt Roads Naval Station
Vega Baja Auxiliary Aerodrome

Fictional
Betio Airfield, an airport appearing in the video game Call of Duty: World at War – Final Fronts; its name is written on the third campaign level
Verdant Meadows Airfield, an airstrip based on Davis–Monthan Air Force Base and appearing in the video game Grand Theft Auto: San Andreas
Sandy Shores Airfield, an airfield based on Amboy Airfield and appearing in the video game Grand Theft Auto V

References

Defunct
United States
Airports